The 1802 United States House of Representatives elections in New York were held from April 27 to 29, 1802, to elect 17 U.S. Representatives to represent the State of New York in the United States House of Representatives of the 8th United States Congress.

Background
Ten U.S. Representatives had been elected in April 1800 to a term in the 7th United States Congress beginning on March 4, 1801. Thomas Tillotson and John Bird had resigned their seats, and Theodorus Bailey and John P. Van Ness were elected to fill the vacancies. Van Ness's seat was declared vacant on January 17, 1803. The other nine representatives' term would end on March 3, 1803. The congressional elections were held together with the State elections in late April 1802, about ten months before the term would start on March 4, 1803, and about a year and three months before Congress actually met on October 17, 1803.

Congressional districts
Until the previous elections, there had been ten congressional districts. After the U.S. census of 1800, Congress re-apportioned the seats, and New York's representation was increased to 17. On March 30, 1802, the New York State Legislature re-apportioned the congressional districts. 
The 1st District comprising Queens and Suffolk counties.
The 2nd District comprising the 1st, 2nd, 3rd and 5th Ward of New York County; and Kings and Richmond counties.
The 3rd District comprising the 4th, 6th and 7th Ward of New York County.
The 4th District comprising Westchester and Rockland counties.
The 5th District comprising Orange County.
The 6th District comprising Dutchess County.
The 7th District comprising  Ulster and Greene counties.
The 8th District comprising Columbia County.
The 9th District comprising Albany County.
The 10th District comprising Rensselaer County.
The 11th District comprising Clinton, Saratoga and Essex counties.
The 12th District comprising Washington County.
The 13th District comprising Montgomery and Schoharie counties.
The 14th District comprising Delaware and Otsego counties.
The 15th District comprising Herkimer and Oneida counties.
The 16th District comprising  Chenango, Tioga and Onondaga counties.
The 17th District comprising Ontario, Steuben and Cayuga counties.

Note: There are now 62 counties in the State of New York. The counties which are not mentioned in this list had not yet been established, or sufficiently organized, the area being included in one or more of the abovementioned counties.

Result
12 Democratic-Republicans and 5 Federalists were elected. The incumbents Smith, Mitchill, Van Cortlandt, Thomas and Van Rensselaer were re-elected; the incumbent Van Ness was defeated.

Note: The Anti-Federalists called themselves "Republicans." However, at the same time, the Federalists called them "Democrats" which was meant to be pejorative. After some time both terms got more and more confused, and sometimes used together as "Democratic Republicans" which later historians have adopted (with a hyphen) to describe the party from the beginning, to avoid confusion with both the later established and still existing Democratic and Republican parties.

Aftermath and special elections
John Cantine, elected in the 7th D., resigned his seat before the congressional term began. A special election to fill the vacancy was held at the time of the annual State election in April 1803, and was won by Josiah Hasbrouck, of the same party.

Isaac Bloom, elected in the 6th D., died on April 26, 1803, before Congress met. A special election to fill the vacancy was held in September 1803, and was won by Daniel C. Verplanck, of the same party.

The House of Representatives of the 8th United States Congress met for the first time at the United States Capitol in Washington, D.C., on October 17, 1803, and Griswold, Hasbrouck, Livingston, McCord, Mitchill, Palmer, Sammons, Sands, Thomas, Van Cortlandt and Verplanck took their seats on this day. Smith took his seat on October 20; Patterson and Root on October 21; Van Rensselaer on October 29; Phelps on November 7; and Tibbits on November 15.

John Smith, from the 1st D., resigned his seat effective February 22, 1804, after his election to the U.S. Senate. A special election to fill the vacancy was held at the time of the annual State election in April 1804, and was won by Samuel Riker, of the same party. Riker took his seat on November 5, 1804.

(Note: The vacancy in the 8th Congress and the next term in the 9th Congress were filled at the same election. The candidate with the higher number of votes won the full term, the next best was elected to fill the vacancy. Thus Wickes succeeded Riker on March 4, 1805.)

Samuel L. Mitchill, who had been re-elected in the 3rd D. in April 1804 to a third term, beginning on March 4, 1805, resigned his seat on November 22, 1804, after his election to the U.S. Senate. A special election to fill both vacancies (the remainder of his term in the 8th Congress and his seat in the 9th Congress) was held, and were won by George Clinton, Jr., of the same party. Clinton took his seat in the 8th Congress on February 14, 1805, and remained in office after March 4.

Notes

Sources
The New York Civil List compiled in 1858 (see: pg. 65 for district apportionment; pg. 69 for Congressmen)
Members of the Eighth United States Congress
Election result 1st D. at Tufts University Library project "A New Nation Votes"
Election result 2nd D. at Tufts University Library project "A New Nation Votes"
Election result 3rd D. at Tufts University Library project "A New Nation Votes"
Election result 4th D. at Tufts University Library project "A New Nation Votes"
Election result 5h D. at Tufts University Library project "A New Nation Votes"
Election result 6th D. at Tufts University Library project "A New Nation Votes"
Election result 7th D. at Tufts University Library project "A New Nation Votes" [Here the numbers indicate victory of Elmendorf, which is inconsistent with Elmendorf running again at the special election, confirming the fact that it was Cantine who resigned.]
Election result 8th D. at Tufts University Library project "A New Nation Votes"
Election result 9th D. at Tufts University Library project "A New Nation Votes"
Election result 10th D. at Tufts University Library project "A New Nation Votes"
Election result 11th D. at Tufts University Library project "A New Nation Votes"
Election result 12th D. at Tufts University Library project "A New Nation Votes"
Election result 13th D. at Tufts University Library project "A New Nation Votes"
Election result 14th D. at Tufts University Library project "A New Nation Votes"
Election result 15th D. at Tufts University Library project "A New Nation Votes"
Election result 16th D. at Tufts University Library project "A New Nation Votes"
Election result 17th D. at Tufts University Library project "A New Nation Votes"
Special election result 7th D. at Tufts University Library project "A New Nation Votes"
Special election result 6th D. at Tufts University Library project "A New Nation Votes"
Special election result 1st D. at Tufts University Library project "A New Nation Votes"

1802
1802 New York (state) elections
New York